William Henry Sewell (died 13 March 1862) was an English amateur cricketer who played first-class cricket from 1822 to 1827.  He was mainly associated with Marylebone Cricket Club (MCC), of which he was a member, and made 8 known appearances in first-class matches, including 4 for the Gentlemen.

References

Date of birth unknown
1862 deaths
English cricketers
English cricketers of 1787 to 1825
English cricketers of 1826 to 1863
Marylebone Cricket Club cricketers
Gentlemen cricketers